= Horse Racing Classic =

1982 video game

- Developer: Tazumi Software
- Publisher: Tazumi Software
- Platform: Apple II
- Release: 1982
- Genre: Sports

Horse Racing Classic is a video game for the Apple II published by Tazumi Software in 1982.

== Gameplay ==
Horse Racing Classic is a game in which horse racing is simulated.

== Reception ==
Barry Austin reviewed the game for Computer Gaming World, and stated that "HRC is a good horse racing simulation, a good teaching tool, and just a darn good party game. There have been several horse race games written for the Apple (most were little more than lo-res programming exercises), but HRC stands apart."
